The women's 1500 metres at the 2019 World Athletics Championships was held at the Khalifa International Stadium in Doha, Qatar, from 2 to 5 October 2019.

Summary
Like the men, championship level women's 1500s also typically turn into strategic, sit and kick affairs.  In 2017, strategic worked for Faith Kipyegon to leave the world record holder Genzebe Dibaba behind.  Sifan Hassan was also left behind by that tactic.  In 2019, she set the world record in the mile and had already won the 10,000 metres at these championships.

The final started inauspiciously enough, Gabriela DeBues-Stafford eventually found herself in the lead, Hassan dropped to the back of the pack.  After 200 metres, Hassan moved out to lane 2 and moved forward around everyone into the lead.  Kipyegon and Gudaf Tsegay moved in behind her to watch.  Even with the slow start the first lap was 1:03.51.  None of the chasing runners looked relaxed, most were working hard to stay up.  Laura Muir and Jenny Simpson moved up toward the front.  The second lap was 1:02.44.  During the third lap, Muir positioned herself for the final lap, getting onto Kipyegon's shoulder coming onto the home stretch, then up to Hassan's just before the bell at 2:52.59.  Muir stayed in position through the turn, Kipyegon and Tsegay behind her a gap forming behind.  Hassan ran the third lap in 1:01.46, then looked back at Muir and took off sprinting.  A big gap formed quickly, Kipyegon going around Muir in chase.  Hassan kept looking back like a hunted animal being chased, but the gap continued to grow as did Kipyegon's separation from the next group of four;  Muir, Tsegay, Shelby Houlihan with DeBues-Stafford trying to hold on.  As Kipyegon saw hope was lost, she began to slow back toward the chasers.  Houlihan moved to lane 2 to try to sprint past Tsegay, instead Tsegay pulled away gaining on Kipyegon.  Hassan won by close to 15 metres.  Kipyegon glided across the line for silver barely ahead of a rapidly closing Tsegay.

Hassan's time of 3:51.95, places her as the #6 runner in history behind Dibaba and two infamous races in China in the 1990s.  Well beaten, Kipyegon, Tsegay and Houlihan moved to #11, #13 and #15 on that list respectively.  Even sixth place DeBues-Stafford ranks as #21.  Hassan set the European record that had been held by Soviet Tatyana Kazankina for 39 years, Houlihan the North American record, Kipyegon the Kenyan record and DeBues-Stafford the Canadian record.

Records
Before the competition records were as follows:

The following records were established during the competition:

Schedule
The event schedule, in local time (UTC+3), is as follows:

Results

Heats
The first six in each heat (Q) and the next six fastest (q) qualified for the semi-finals.

Semi-finals
The first 5 in each heat (Q) and the next two fastest (q) qualified for the final.

Final
The final was started on 5 October at 20:55.

References

Women's 1500 metres
Women's 1500 metres